Kellerman is a surname. Notable people with the surname include:

Adam Kellerman (born 1990), Australian wheelchair tennis player
Annette Kellerman (1887–1975), Australian swimmer, vaudeville star, film actress and writer
Barbara Kellerman (born 1949), English actress
Barbara Kellerman (academic), professor of public leadership at Harvard University's John F. Kennedy School of Government
Brian Kellerman, American basketball player
Ernie Kellerman (born 1943), American retired National Football League player
Faye Kellerman (born 1952), American novelist
François Christophe de Kellermann (1735–1820), French military commander (father, known as Kellermann)
François Étienne de Kellermann (1770–1835), French cavalry general (son, also known as Kellermann)
Ivy Kellerman
Jonathan Kellerman (born 1949), American psychologist and novelist
Martin Kellerman (born 1973), Swedish cartoonist
Max Kellerman (born 1973), American boxing commentator and sports talk radio host
Roy Kellerman (1915–1984), US Secret Service Agent on duty when President John F. Kennedy was assassinated
Sally Kellerman (1937–2022), American actress
William Ashbrook Kellerman (1850–1908), U.S. botanist, mycologist and photographer
Wouter Kellerman (born 1961), South African flautist and music composer

Fictional characters:
Mike Kellerman, character in the television series Homicide: Life on the Street
Max Kellerman, owner of Kellerman's Catskills resort in the 1987 film Dirty Dancing
Paul Kellerman, character in the television series Prison Break

See also
Kellermann